Harry William Payne (5 September 1892 – 5 July 1969) was a British long-distance runner who competed in the marathon at the 1928 Summer Olympics in Amsterdam and was a two-time national champion. He was born in Bedfordshire.

Athletics
On 26 May 1928, Payne debuted at the marathon distance and posted a fourth-place finish at the Polytechnic Marathon (2:54:50.8). Six weeks later on 6 July 1928, he won the Amateur Athletic Association's marathon championship in only his second marathon. His performance of 2:34:34 set on the Polytechnic Marathon course was a new British record. The following month, an injured Payne finished 13th in marathon at the 1928 Summer Olympics in Amsterdam (2:42:29).

At the 1929 AAA championships, Payne's 2:30:57.6 mark would earn him a second consecutive title and recapture the British marathon record from Sam Ferris – a mark that would stand for 22 years.With this performance, Payne was ranked first in the marathon for 1929.

He competed in the marathon at the 1930 British Empire Games for England.

Personal life
He was a clerk at the time of the 1930 Games and lived in Woodford Green.

Notes

References

1892 births
1969 deaths
People from Bedfordshire
English male marathon runners
Olympic athletes of Great Britain
Athletes (track and field) at the 1928 Summer Olympics
Commonwealth Games competitors for England
Athletes (track and field) at the 1930 British Empire Games